17 Greatest Hits is a compilation album by artist David Allan Coe featuring highlights from early in his career.

Track listing

Chart performance

References

David Allan Coe compilation albums
1985 greatest hits albums
Columbia Records compilation albums